Jony Marcos de Souza Araujo (born 30 September 1977) more commonly known as Jony Marcos and Pastor Jony  is a Brazilian politician and pastor. Although born in Mato Grosso do Sul, he has spent his political career representing Sergipe, having served as state representative since 2015.

Personal life
Jony Marcos was born to João Feliciano Rodrigues de Araújo and Eva de Souza Araújo. Prior to becoming a politician Jony Marcos worked as a radio personality, and he still maintains a radio talk show. He is a pastor of the Universal Church of the Kingdom of God. He is a member of the evangelical caucus in the legislature.

Political career
Jony Marcos voted in favor of the impeachment motion of then-president Dilma Rousseff. He would later vote in favor of opening a similar corruption investigation against Rousseff's successor Michel Temer, and voted against the 2017 Brazilian labor reforms.

References

1977 births
Living people
People from Mato Grosso do Sul
Republicans (Brazil) politicians
Brazilian radio personalities
Brazilian Pentecostal pastors
Members of the Universal Church of the Kingdom of God
Members of the Chamber of Deputies (Brazil) from Sergipe